Mycobacterium tokaiense is a species of Mycobacterium.

References

External links
Type strain of Mycobacterium tokaiense at BacDive -  the Bacterial Diversity Metadatabase

tokaiense
Acid-fast bacilli